The Roma Nomentana railway station is a railway station in Rome located between the African quarter and the neighborhood Monte Sacro, connected to each other by a pedestrian underpass. The station and exchange car park can be accessed from via Valle d'Aosta, a road located between Via Nomentana and via delle Valli.

History 
The station was opened on 25 November 1983.

References

External links

Nomentana
Railway stations opened in 1983
Rome Q. XVI Monte Sacro
Rome Q. XVII Trieste
1983 establishments in Italy
Railway stations in Italy opened in the 20th century